Suleymanovo (Söläymän) is a rural locality (a village) in Nagadaksky Selsoviet, Aurgazinsky District, Bashkortostan, Russia. The population was 34 as of 2010. There is 1 street.

Geography 
Suleymanovo is located 43 km northeast of Tolbazy (the district's administrative centre) by road. Novogurovka is the nearest rural locality.

References 

Rural localities in Aurgazinsky District